Sheila E. is the third solo album by Sheila E., released on Paisley Park Records/Warner Bros. Records in July 1987.

Two singles were released from the album in the US, "Hold Me" and "Koo Koo", although both failed to make a major impact on the Hot 100. "Love on a Blue Train" was the first single released in Japan. The album is notable for its Latin influence and prominent presence in this hybrid of jazz, rock, funk and salsa. The video for "Koo Koo" shows Sheila dancing with Cat Glover.

The album has the earliest recorded appearance of members from the group Tony! Toni! Toné!, who Sheila E. attempted to bring to Paisley Park, but Prince did not sign the group. Almost a decade later, in 1996, Sheila E. appeared on their final album, House of Music.

Critical reception
The Rolling Stone Album Guide called the album "flat and mechanical, boasting some rhythmic flash but not enough melody to make it worthwhile."

Track listing

Personnel

 Sheila E. – vocals, percussion
 Levi Seacer, Jr. – guitar, bass guitar, keyboards, backing vocals
 Juan Escovedo – percussion
 Boni Boyer – keyboards, backing vocals
 Timothy Riley – drums
 Norbert Stachel – soprano, alto, tenor and baritone saxophones, flute, clarinet
 Carl Wheeler – keyboards, backing vocals
 Rafael Wiggins, Jr. – bass guitar, backing vocals
 Peter Michael Escovedo – percussion
 Eric Leeds – saxophone 
 Matt Blistan (aka Atlanta Bliss) – trumpet
 Eddie Minnifield – backing vocals
 Carlos Rios – guitar
 Howard Kenney – backing vocals
 Steph Birnbaum – guitar
Technical
 Coke Johnson, David Leonard, Peggy McCreary Leonard – recording engineers
 Jeff DeMorris, Mike Kloster, Steve Himmelfarb, Leslie Ann Jones, Chuck Webb, Thom Kidd, Tom Wright – second engineers
 Mary Ann Dibs – art direction and design
 Jeff Katz – photography
 Chris Bellman – mastering at Bernie Grundman Mastering

Charts

References

1987 albums
Sheila E. albums
Paisley Park Records albums
Warner Records albums